Wojciech Kurtyka (also Voytek Kurtyka, born 25 July 1947, in Skrzynka near Kłodzko) is a Polish mountaineer and rock climber, one of the pioneers of the alpine style of climbing the biggest walls in the Greater Ranges. He lived in Wrocław up to 1974 when he moved to Kraków. He graduated as engineer in electronics (in 1973 at Wrocław University of Technology). In 1985 he climbed the  "Shining Wall," the west face of Gasherbrum IV, which Climbing magazine declared to be the greatest achievement of mountaineering in the twentieth century. In 2016, he received the Piolet d'Or for lifetime achievement in mountaineering.

Career

His climbs in Poland consist of many difficult climbs – in crags, the hardest free climbs and free solo climbs of the time. In the Tatra Mountains he did a lot of first free ascents, first ascents in winter and established new winter routes.

Kurtyka became well known abroad in early 1973 after achieving the first winter ascent of Trollveggen (Troll Wall) in Norway, the highest vertical cliff on the continent (4 men Polish team, see the list of climbs below). He started in Greater Ranges in 1972, completing a little-known – but important according to him – first ascent of the wall of Akher Chogh in Hindu Kush, in lightweight, alpine style. He started climbing in the Himalayas in 1974. After participating in two big Polish national expeditions in 1974 and 1976, he gradually turned to lightweight expeditions.

His teammates were such world-class Himalayan climbers as, among others, Alex MacIntyre (1977, 1978, 1980, 1981), Jerzy Kukuczka (1981, 1983, 1984), Doug Scott (1993, Nanga Parbat attempt), Erhard Loretan (1988, 1990, 1991, 1997), Reinhold Messner (1982, Cho Oyu winter attempt), Yasushi Yamanoi (2000, 2001, K2 and Latok attempts).

The ideas of minimal equipment and support even on the most difficult walls and highest peaks was included in his philosophical concept of the "path of the mountain".

Kurtyka's and Robert Schauer's (Austrian) climb of the west face (Shining Wall) of Gasherbrum IV in 1985 was selected by Climbing magazine as one of the 10 most impressive climbs of the 20th century (including rock climbing, bouldering etc.).

Besides being a climber, Kurtyka is author of many articles on climbing published in Polish and English. He is also an inventor (around 1980) of the local Polish grading system of free climbs. This system uses an opened scale, called "Kurtyka scale" or "Krakowska scale".

In 2016, he received the Piolet d'Or Carrière (Lifetime Achievement Award).

Selected climbs

Rock climbing
 New routes up to 8a, 8a+ in Polish crags,
 Free solo ascent of 7c+ route in 1993 - actually probably the hardest free solo climb in Poland

European mountains
High Tatras
 1970 – Mały Młynarz (Malý Mlynár in Slovak), NE face, new free route (which opens the grade higher than VI (in UIAA scale); commonly called Kurtykówka), with Michał Gabryel, Janusz Kurczab
 1972 – Kazalnica, Pająki route (route of the Slovak group "The Spiders"), first winter ascent, with Kazimierz Głazek, Marek Kęsicki
 1973 – Kocioł Kazalnicy (Kazalnica Cwm, Kazalnica Sanctuary), Superściek (Super Sewer) route, 1st ascent (in winter), with Piotr Jasiński, Krzysztof Pankiewicz, Zbigniew Wach
 1980 – Kazalnica, Kant Filara (The Edge of The Pillar), first free ascent (actually the hardest free route in the Tatras), with Władysław Janowski
 Kazalnica, other first winter ascents and new routes, 1971, 1992
 1991 – new routes up to 7c+ in limestone part of Tatras

Mountains of Norway
 1973 – Trollryggen, N face (Troll Wall), Romsdal Valley, French route (French directissima), first winter ascent, with Marek Kęsicki, Ryszard Kowalewski, Tadeusz Piotrowski (all Polish)

Alps, Mont Blanc Massif
 1971 – Aiguille Noire, W face, Vitali-Ratti route, first Polish ascent, with Janusz Kurczab
 1973 – Petit Dru, W face, Directe Americaine, first Polish ascent, with Andrzej Tarnawski
 1973 – Petit Dru, N face, new route in left part (Voie Petit Jean, to commemorate Jan Franczuk who died during the 1971 Kunyang Chhish expedition), with Jerzy Kukuczka and Marek Łukaszewski
 1975 – Grandes Jorasses, N face (Pointe Hélène, Polish route), new route, with Jerzy Kukuczka and Marek Łukaszewski

Great Ranges
 1972 – Kohe Tez, 7015 m (Hindu Kush, Afghanistan), N ridge, new route, with Alicja Bednarz, Ryszard Kozioł (all Polish)
 1972 – Akher Chogh, 7025 m or 7017 m (Hindu Kush, Afghanistan), NW face, new route, with Jacek Rusiecki, Marek Kowalczyk, Piotr Jasiński (all Polish)
 1974 – Lhotse 8516 m, member of the first winter (autumn to winter) expedition (Andrzej Zawada, leader, and Andrzej Heinrich on 27 December reached height ca. 8250 m)
 1976 – K2, 8611 m, East ridge, attempt (Kurtyka reached ca. 7900 m, the highest point reached by expedition ca. 8400 m (Eugeniusz Chrobak, Wojciech Wróż - this long route was finished to the summit - via a diversion of the top section of the Abruzzi Ridge - in 1978 by American expedition led by James Whittaker). The complete line to the summit via the NE-Ridge is as yet virgin. 
 1977 – Kohe Bandaka, 6868 m (Hindu Kush, Afghanistan), NE face, new route, with Alex MacIntyre and John Porter
 1978 – Changabang, 6864 m (Garhwal Himalaya, India), S face direct, new route, with Alex MacIntyre, John Porter and Krzysztof Żurek (Polish)
 1981 – Makalu, 8481 m, West face, two attempts of direct new route (during the second, in autumn, they reached ca. 7900 m), with Jerzy Kukuczka, Alex MacIntyre (later Kukuczka reached the summit in solo climb via the variation of the normal route)
 1982 – Cho Oyu, winter attempt, with Reinhold Messner
 1985 – Gasherbrum IV, 7925 m (Baltoro, Karakoram), West face (Shining Wall), first ascent, alpine style, (not to the summit), with Robert Schauer (Austrian)
 1988 – Trango (Nameless) Tower, 6239 m (Baltoro, Karakoram), E face, new route, with Erhard Loretan
 1987-2000 – K2, W face, several (4 or 5) attempts, up to 6650 m (1994)
 1993, 1997 – Nanga Parbat, 8126 m, Mazeno Ridge, attempts
 1995 – Losar, 700 m high icefall above Namche Bazaar, Nepal, 2nd ascent, with Maciej Rysula (Polish)
 2001 – Biacherahi Tower, Central, ca. 5700 m (Choktoi Glacier, Karakoram, S face, new route (Japanese-Polish Picnic), with Taeko and Yasushi Yamanoi (during attempts to Latok I N buttress)

Eight-thousanders
 1980 – Dhaulagiri - East face, new route, alpine style (not to the summit), with René Ghilini (Swiss), Alex MacIntyre and Ludwik Wilczyński (Polish)
 1982 – Broad Peak - normal route, alpine style, with Jerzy Kukuczka
 1983 – Gasherbrum I, Gasherbrum II - two new routes, alpine style, with Jerzy Kukuczka (Polish Alex MacIntyre Memorial Expedition)
 1984 – Broad Peak - Traverse of all three Broad Peak summits, North (new route), Middle (or Central) and Main, alpine style, with Jerzy Kukuczka
 1990 – Cho Oyu - SW face, new route, alpine style, with Erhard Loretan and Jean Troillet
 1990 – Shisha Pangma, central summit 8008 m, S face, new route, alpine style, with Erhard Loretan and Jean Troillet

References

Bibliography

Self-authored articles in English
 The Gasherbrums Are Lonely, Mountain, No. 97, May/June 1984
 The Abseil and the Ascent, The Art of Abseiling into the Hell, The Himalayan Journal, Vol. 42, 1985
 The Shining Wall of Gasherbrum IV, American Alpine Journal (AAJ), 1986 (Vol. 28), pp. 1–5
 The Path of the Mountain, Alpinism, Vol. 1, 1986
 Broad Peak North Ridge, Climbing, No. 94, February 1986
 The Art of Suffering, Mountain, No. 121, May/June 1988
 The East Face of Trango’s Nameless Tower, AAJ 1989, pp. 45–49
 Trango Extremes, Mountain, No. 127, May/June 1989, pp. 22–27
 New Routes, Cho Oyu and Shisha Pangma, AAJ 1991, pp. 14–18
 The Polish Syndrome, Mountain Review, No. 5,  November/December 1993, pp. 36–47
 The Polish Syndrome, [as a chapter in:] Chris Bonington, Audrey Salkeld (editors), Great Climbs: a celebration of world mountaineering, Publ. Mitchell Beazley, London 1994; Chris Bonington, Audrey Salkeld (editors), Heroic climbs: a celebration of world mountaineering, The Mountaineers, Seattle 1994
 The Shining Wall, Alpinist, No. 2, Spring 2003
 Losar, Alpinist, No. 4, Autumn 2003

Other sources
 Marek Brniak, Troll Wall in Winter, Summit, October 1976 (and Climber&Rambler, March 1976)
 John Porter, Bandaka and Changabang, AAJ 1979; Changabang South Buttress, Climbing, No 55, 1979; South Side Story, Mountain, No. 65, January/February 1979
 Alex MacIntyre, Dhaulagiri’s East Face, AAJ 1981; Broken English, Mountain, No. 77, January/February 1981
 Biacherahi Central, High, No. 234, May 2002 (Mountain Info, edited by Lindsay Griffin, with info from climbers, p. 67-68, with topo of the massif)

Interviews with, and broad articles on Wojciech Kurtyka
 Nicholas O’Connell, Beyond Risk. Conversations with Climbers, chapter X, The Mountaineers, Seattle 1993
 Greg Child, Between the Hammer and the Anvil. The Art of Suffering, Climbing, No. 115, Aug/Sept 1989, pp. 78–86 [in the set of three articles, "profiles of three Polish superstars", Kurtyka, Wanda Rutkiewicz and Jerzy Kukuczka, up to p. 93]

External links
 Wojciech Kurtyka climbing profile on climbandmore.com , with detailed list of ascents of 1970-2003, including rock climbs (access on March 22, 2010)
 American Alpine Journal, internet access , with search engine (access on March 22, 2010)
 Wojciech Kurtyka climbing profile on bergfieber.de , with clear review of Himalayan ascents of 1977-2003 (access on March 22, 2010)
 Karakorum, Biacherahi 2001, Kurtyka on nyka.home.pl , with topo (access on March 22, 2010)
 Wojciech "Voytek" Kurtyka , (access on May 25, 2015)

1947 births
Living people
People from Kłodzko County
Polish mountain climbers
Polish rock climbers
Free soloists
Sportspeople from Lower Silesian Voivodeship
Piolet d'Or winners